The Don M. Stromquist House, designed by Frank Lloyd Wright, is located on a ten-acre site in Bountiful, Utah. It is sited halfway down an arroyo or canyon wall. The house has an endless view of the Great Salt Lake and Antelope Island.

Architect
Frank Lloyd Wright designed the house on a grid of 60 and 120 degree angles which formed a series of parallelograms. The grid lines are poured in the concrete floors, and the ceiling has the same grid lines reflected in small strips of wood. The house is constructed from salmon colored concrete-blocks, steel beams, glass and Philippine mahogany.

Wright drew up plans for the furniture, further unifying the look with a dining room table, the lines of which mirror the grid in the floor,  built-in settees, lamp tables and book shelves.  Freestanding furniture designed by Wright, included a coffee table and hassocks. Even the fireplace tools, with half-diamond shapes on the handles, were designed by the architect.

Main structure
The main house features three small bedrooms, two granite-clad (an addition Stromquist made after he repurchased the home) bathrooms, a kitchen, semi-formal dining, 
laundry, utility room, two fireplaces, and two balconies. Clerestory windows provide natural lighting. The master bedroom has its own fireplace and French doors that lead to a secluded balcony. Heating is provided by a combined radiant and forced-air system that utilizes two natural gas furnaces, which was designed by William Wesley "Wes" Peters, Wright's son-in-law and chief engineer.

As a boy, Don Stromquist had attended a speech by Frank Lloyd Wright, and was impressed. When it was time for him to build a home, he asked Wright to design it. Construction on the home began in 1959 and was completed in 1961 at a cost of about $32,000, when Stromquist and his wife, Jane, were newlyweds. Wright died in 1959, before the house was completed. After living in the home for several years, the home was purchased by Mr. Stromquist's employer, U.S. Steel, when Mr. Stromquist's position was relocated to the company's headquarters in Pittsburgh, Pennsylvania. Thirty years later, the couple moved back to Utah to find that the house had been abandoned, vandalized, and eventually sold as horse property. George M. Frandsen and his partner, David A. Carlquist, both Utah natives, later bought the home and restored it to the details of the original architectural drawings. Taliesin Associated Architects John deKoven Hill and Cornelia Brierly oversaw the restoration. Breirly had been Wright's color and fabric consultant when the home was first designed. At the completion of the restoration she commented that the home was the best preserved example of Wright's Usonian architecture. During the ten years the home was owned by Frandsen and Carlquist, fundraising events were frequently held there to benefit local nonprofit organizations, including the couple's favorite, the American Civil Liberties Union (ACLU). The Stromquists were members of the ACLU and were invited to speak at a fundraising event held in the home and gardens.  A friendship between the Stromquists and the men developed.  Later, when the men decided to move from Utah, they sold the home to the Stromquists, who moved back into the house. Mrs. Stromquist died there a short time later. The home has been occupied by Don's son, George, since Don's death in 2009.

References
 Storrer, William Allin. The Frank Lloyd Wright Companion. University Of Chicago Press, 2006,  (S.429)

External links
 ARCHUtah / Utah Architecture / Don M. Stromquist House (1958)
 Celebrate Frank Lloyd Wright in Bountiful
 Donald M. Stromquist House, Bountiful, Utah - Archiplanet
 Photo of the Stromquist House
 Timeless Treasures | North America > United States from AllBusiness.com
 Careless Thoughts and Other Accidental Endeavors: The Stromquist House
 The Wright Stuff - Standard.NET - Standard-Examiner
 Arcaid Feature: Donald M. Stromquist House
 Photos of the Stromquist House from the J. Willard Marriott Library

Frank Lloyd Wright buildings
Houses in Utah
Houses in Davis County, Utah
1959 establishments in Utah